Popstar: A Dream Come True is the debut album by Filipino singer Sarah Geronimo, released on September 11, 2003, in the Philippines by Viva Records. It was produced by Vincent del Rosario. After winning the grand champion title on Star for a Night, she signed a recording contract with the label and immediately recorded and released her first album. The album was a collaboration of the most respected composers, namely, Vehnee Saturno, Ogie Alcasid, George Canseco, Wency Cornejo and Jun Murillo. The album includes her winning cover of the Celine Dion hit single "To Love You More", which was also released as the first single. The album was a commercial success peaking at number one in the Philippine Top 10 Albums chart, and remained number one position for five weeks. It was the 2003's best selling album in the Philippines. It is considered as the best-selling debut album in the Philippines selling more than 210,000 units which was certified 7× Platinum in 2006. To date, the album had sold 300,000 copies in the Philippines making it the eight best-selling album in the country.

Background
In 2002, the financial problems of Geronimo's family inspired her to compete in the Star for a Night competition, hosted by Regine Velasquez. At the age of fourteen she won the competition, which included a PHP 1 million cash prize and a managerial contract to Vicente Del Rosario, owner of Viva Entertainment. She was also given the title of "Popstar Princess". Her mother said, "Her cash prize in Star For a Night was a big help. This school year, we don't need to borrow money from other people for my children's tuition fees".

Reception
Popstar: A Dream Come True has performed well commercially and critically. On the 2004 Awit Awards, it received four nominations (Best Female, Best New Female, Best Dance for "Sa Iyo" and Song of the Year for "Forever's Not Enough"). She won two of the four categories, namely Best Performance by a New Female Recording Artist and Best Dance Song. She lost the Best Female award to Lani Misalucha and the Song of the Year award to Parokya ni Edgar's "Mr. Suave".

Commercial performance
In the Philippines, Popstar A Dream Come True debuted at number six on the Philippine Top 10 Albums chart, then after a week it climbed at number one on the chart, replacing Parokya ni Edgar's Bigotilyo album on being number one position. The album remained number one on the chart for five consecutive weeks until the week of (December 15, 2003) making it the longest number one charting album and Geronimo's commercial success album. The album left the chart at number seven position, it spent a total of eleven weeks on the chart according to Titik Filipino data. As of 2006, the album had sold 210,000 copies in the Philippines being certified 7× Platinum in the country. To date, Popstar A Dream Come True had sold more than 300,000 copies in the Philippines, making it the eight best-selling album in the country.

Charts

Track listing 
 "Just Believe" (Dennis Garcia) — 4:34
 "If Only" (Ogie Alcasid) — 3:53
 "Ibulong Sa Hangin" (Emil Pama) — 4:14
 "Forever's Not Enough" (Vehnee Saturno, Doris Saturno) — 4:28
 "It's All Coming Back To Me Now" (Jim Steinman) — 5:15
 "Sa Iyo" (Jun Murillo) — 3:36
 "Narito" (Alcasid) — 3:36
 "I Will Do Anything for Love" (Steinman) — 5:19
 "Twin Hearts" (featuring Devotion) (Wency Cornejo) — 3:39
 "When I Met You" (Jim Paredes) — 4:30
 "Broken Vow" (with Mark Bautista) (Walter Afanasieff, Lara Sofie Katy Crokaert) — 4:32
 "Nananaginip ng Gising" (Jonathan Florido) — 4:21
 "We Are Tomorrow" (Cornejo) — 4:02
 "Paano Kita Mapasasalamatan" (George Canseco) — 4:15
 "To Love You More" (Junior Miles, David Foster) — 4:38

References

Sarah Geronimo albums
2003 debut albums
Viva Records (Philippines) albums